Sha Tau Kok Control Point is a land immigration control point of Hong Kong, located in Sha Tau Kok, North District, New Territories, Hong Kong, along the border between mainland China and Hong Kong.

Opening
Sha Tau Kok was the second cross-border road link between Hong Kong and mainland China, after Man Kam To Control Point. It was officially opened on 28 February 1985 by Zhen Xipui, deputy mayor of Shenzhen, and John Boyd, a Hong Kong government official.

The crossing is open from 7am to 10pm. Its counterpart across the border is the Shatoujiao Port.

Traffic
The control point is mainly used by vehicles (cars and lorries). It acts as a border gateway from or to places in eastern Guangdong Province, such as Huizhou and Chaoshan. But it is one of the least frequently used immigration control point in Hong Kong. 

Including both drivers and passengers, the Sha Tau Kok Control Point processed 3,866,065 people in 2015, making it the least-used of the four road border crossings in Hong Kong.

Public transport 
'Sha Tau Kok Express' buses run to and from Sheung Shui bus station.

See also 
Sha Tau Kok

References

Sha Tau Kok
North District, Hong Kong
China–Hong Kong border crossings
Closed Area